Declan Kelly was the Ambassador of Ireland to Malaysia and Thailand from 2010 to 2015. Prior to that appointment he was the Ambassador of Ireland to Canada, succeeding Martin Burke.

He was schooled at St. Vincent's C.B.S., Glasnevin, and is married to Anne Bernadette Kelly. He gave the 2007 convocation address at St. Thomas University in New Brunswick.

Prior to his placement as ambassador at the Irish embassy in Ottawa, Kelly was the ambassador to Australia, New Zealand and Fiji.  Earlier, Kelly had been posted to Ottawa from 1985 to 1990 as the First Secretary and Charge d’Affairs at the Irish Embassy.

Kelly was Republic of Ireland Consul General in San Francisco from 1992 to 1998.

References

Living people
Year of birth missing (living people)
Ambassadors of Ireland to Canada
Ambassadors of Ireland to Australia
Ambassadors of Ireland to Malaysia
Ambassadors of Ireland to Thailand
Ambassadors of Ireland to New Zealand
Ambassadors of Ireland to the Bahamas
Ambassadors of Ireland to Fiji
20th-century Irish people
21st-century Irish people
21st-century diplomats
Irish diplomats
People educated at St. Vincent's C.B.S., Glasnevin